Stanley Ernest Wayth (28 June 1883 – 13 June 1932) was an Australian rules footballer who played with Geelong in the Victorian Football League (VFL).

Notes

External links 

1883 births
1932 deaths
Australian rules footballers from Victoria (Australia)
Geelong Football Club players